Northampton Guildhall is a municipal building in St Giles' Square in Northampton, England. It is a Grade II* listed building.

History

The first guildhall in Northampton was a 12th-century building at the junction of Gold Street and Horsemarket. The second guildhall was an early 14th-century battlemented structure at the corner of Abington Street and Wood Hill; it was sold in 1864 and subsequently demolished.

The current building, the third guildhall, designed by Edward William Godwin in the Gothic Revival style, was officially opened on 17 May 1864. The original part of the building was symmetrical with three first-floor windows either side of the main entrance. The building was extended to the west to the designs of A W Jeffrey and Matthew Holding in 1892, creating a frontage of 14 bays with arcading on the ground floor and windows above on the first floor. The sculptor R.L. Bolton was commissioned to design 14 statues of monarchs and other famous people which were erected on the front elevation between the windows on the first floor. A modern extension to the east, built to accommodate the expanding office needs of Northampton Borough Council, was completed in 1992.

Inside, the great hall displays murals of famous local men, painted by Colin Gill in 1925. It also contains murals of The Muses Contemplating Northampton, painted by Henry Bird in 1949. A statue by Sir Francis Chantrey of Spencer Perceval, Member of Parliament for Northampton and the only British Prime Minister to have been assassinated, was originally unveiled in 1817 and is also on display inside.

A plaque on the eastern extension marks the fact that Diana, Princess of Wales, was made a Freeman of the Borough of Northampton in 1989, marking her and her family's strong connections with the town and with Althorp where she was brought up and is buried. The plaque below the memorial reads: "The memorial above was unveiled by the 9th Earl Spencer in memory of his sister, 7 November 2002 in the presence of the Mayor of Northampton, Michael Geoffrey Boss".

A series of bronze statues of Northampton's "history makers", cast by the sculptor Richard Austin, were unveiled in July 2017 within the courtyard of the 1992 extension.

See also
 Guild
 Guildhall

References

External links 

 Northampton Guildhall - Northampton Borough Council, accessed 19 May 2012

Venetian Gothic architecture in the United Kingdom
Gothic Revival architecture in Northamptonshire
City and town halls in Northamptonshire
Local government in Northamptonshire
Grade II* listed buildings in Northamptonshire
Buildings and structures in Northampton
Government buildings completed in 1864